Emil Thomas Kaiser (February 15, 1938 – July 18, 1988) was a Hungarian-born American biochemist.
Kaiser was most notable for his research of enzyme modification.

He also was noted for developing new types of catalysts and for a more active form of a peptide hormone.

Chicago Tribune said that Kaiser "developed a whole new approach to synthetic chemistry".

Joshua Lederberg, a Nobel laureate and president of Rockefeller University in New York, said that Kaiser's research of "synthetic enzymes and other polypeptides advanced basic scientific understanding in ways that had important implications for medicine".

Kaiser was the Louis Block Professor at the University of Chicago, the Patrick E. and Beatrice M. Haggerty Professor at Rockefeller University, a member of the National Academy of Sciences, the American Academy of Arts and Sciences, the National Institutes of Health and the National Science Foundation.

The Protein Society has established an award in Kaiser's name - The Emil Thomas Kaiser Award which "recognizes a significant contribution in applying chemistry to the study of proteins".

Life and career
Kaiser was born in Budapest, Hungary. He graduated from the University of Chicago with a B.S. degree,  and received his Ph.D. from Harvard University.
He joined the faculty of the University of Chicago in 1963, and advanced to the Louis Block Professorship in 1981. He moved to the Rockefeller University in 1982.

References

External links
F. H. Westheimer, "Emil Thomas Kaiser", Biographical Memoirs of the National Academy of Sciences (1997)

1938 births
1988 deaths
American biochemists
Members of the United States National Academy of Sciences
Scientists from Budapest
Hungarian emigrants to the United States
Rockefeller University people
Harvard University alumni
University of Chicago alumni
Rockefeller University faculty
University of Chicago faculty